Vima Kadphises (Greek: Οοημο Καδφιϲηϲ Ooēmo Kadphisēs (epigraphic); Kharosthi: 𐨬𐨁𐨨 𐨐𐨫𐨿𐨤𐨁𐨭) was a Kushan emperor from approximately 113 to 127 CE. According to the Rabatak inscription, he was the son of Vima Takto and the father of Kanishka.

Rule

Genealogy 
The connection of Vima Kadphises with other Kushan rulers is described in the Rabatak inscription, which Kanishka wrote.  Kanishka makes the list of the kings who ruled up to his time: Kujula Kadphises as his great-grandfather, Vima Taktu as his grandfather, Vima Kadphises as his father, and himself Kanishka:

"... for King Kujula Kadphises (his) great grandfather, and for King Vima Taktu (his) grandfather, and for King Vima Kadphises (his) father, and *also for himself, King Kanishka" (Cribb and Sims-Williams 1995/6: 80)
Emperor Vima Kadphises expanded the Kushan territory in Afghanistan and north-west India, where he may have replaced the Indo-Scythian ruler Sodasa in Mathura.

Coins 

He was the Kushan emperor to first introduce gold coinage, in addition to the existing copper and silver coinage. Most of the gold seems to have been obtained through trade with the Roman Empire. The gold weight standard of approximately eight grams corresponds to that of Roman coins of the 1st century. Gold bullion from Rome would be melted and used for the Kushan mints, into three denominations: the double stater, the stater, and the quarter starter (or dinara).

The usage of gold testifies to the prosperity of the Kushan Empire from the time of Vima, being the center of trade between the Han Dynasty of China (where Vima was known as 阎膏珍), Central Asia and Alexandria and Antioch in the West. The Kushan were able to maintain and protect the Silk road, allowing silk, spices, textiles or medicine to move between China, India and the West. In particular, many goods  were sent by ship to the Roman empire, creating a return flow of gold coins, Greek wine and slaves. Works of arts were also imported from all directions , as indicated by the variety and quality of the artefacts  found in the Kushan summer capital of Bagram in Afghanistan. A strong artistic syncretism was stimulated, as indicated by the Greco-Buddhist art of Gandhara.

Roman history relates the visit of ambassadors from the Indian kings to the court of Trajan (98–117 CE), bearing presents and letters in Greek, which were sent either by Vima Kadphises or his son Kanishka.

Most of Vima's coins feature the Buddhist symbol of the Triratana on the reverse (or possibly Shiva's symbol for Nandi, the Nandipada), together with Hindu representations of Shiva, with or without his bull. Often time, a Trishul is depicted along with Shiva.

Coin types

Footnotes

References
Hill, John E. (2009) Through the Jade Gate to Rome: A Study of the Silk Routes during the Later Han Dynasty, 1st to 2nd Centuries CE. BookSurge, Charleston, South Carolina. .
 Tarn, W. W. (1951). The Greeks in Bactria and India. 3rd Edition 1984. Ares Publishers, Chicago.

External links
Coins of Vima Kadphises
Catalogue of coins of Vima Kadphises

Kushan emperors
2nd-century monarchs in Asia